The Zaandam–Enkhuizen railway is a railway line in the Netherlands running from Zaandam to Enkhuizen, passing through Purmerend and Hoorn. The line was opened between 1884 and 1885 by the Hollandsche IJzeren Spoorweg-Maatschappij.

Stations
On the Zaandam-Enkhuizen railway, the principal interchange stations are:

Zaandam: to Amsterdam and Alkmaar
Hoorn: to Alkmaar

Railway lines in the Netherlands